Gymnosporia dryandri is a species of plant in the family Celastraceae. Common names include Buxo-da-rocha and Madeira shrubby bittersweet. It is endemic to Madeira.

Description
It is a small evergreen tree or shrub growing up to 5 meters high.

Habitat and ecology
Gymnosporia dryandri is native to the Madeira and neighboring islands in the archipelago. It is found from sea level to 400 meters elevation, in woodlands and shrublands with Olea europaea and Ceratonia siliqua, and in lower-elevation laurel forests with Laurus azorica, Ocotea foetens, and other species.

References

Endemic flora of Madeira
dryandri
Plants described in 1881
Taxobox binomials not recognized by IUCN